"Along came a spider" is a line from "Little Miss Muffet".

It may refer to:

Music
 Along Came a Spider (album), 2008 album by Alice Cooper
 Along Came a Spider, 2018 album by the band Spider Rockets

Television
 "Along Came a Spider", 2017 episode of the television series Alone
 "Along Came a Spider", 1962 episode of the television series The Defenders
 "Along Came a Spider", 1968 episode of the television series The Outsider
 Along Came a Spider, a 1970 ABC TV film starring Suzanne Pleshette
 "Along Came a Spider", an episode of the television series Transformers: Animated
 "Along Came a Spider", 2015 episode of the television series Red vs. Blue

Other uses
 Along Came a Spider (novel), 1993 novel by James Patterson
 Along Came a Spider (film), 2001 film adaption of the novel
 Venom: Along Came A Spider, 1996 series of the comic book Venom